The Kay Suzanne Memorial Cup (formerly known as the Kay Suzanne Memorial Trophy) was a professional minor-ranking snooker tournament, which was part of the Players Tour Championship. The tournament started in 2011 and was staged at the Capital Venue in Gloucester, England. Mark Allen was the last champion.

The tournament was named in memory of Capital Venue owner Paul Mount's late sister, who had died of breast cancer. The players wore pink shirts to raise awareness of the disease. The Pink Ribbon tournament was also held at the venue under a similar premise.

Winners

See also
 2010 MIUS Cup
 Pink Ribbon (snooker)

Notes

References

 
Recurring sporting events established in 2011
2011 establishments in England
Recurring events disestablished in 2013
2013 disestablishments in England
Players Tour Championship